Nurobod is a city in Samarqand Region, Uzbekistan. It is the capital of Nurobod District. The town population was 7,817 people in 1989, and 9,600 in 2016.

References

Populated places in Samarqand Region
Cities in Uzbekistan